Renee Rollason (born 22 September 1989) is an Australian footballer who last played for Sydney FC in the Australian W-League.

Rollason made her W-League debut playing for the Central Coast Mariners against Melbourne Victory on Saturday, 25 October 2008. Rollason then made her scoring debut in Round 2 against Perth Glory, scoring a double to assist the Mariners to a 3–1 win at home.

Career statistics

International goals
Scores and results list Australia's goal tally first.

Honours

Club
Sydney FC
 W-League Championship: 2012–13
 W-League Premiership: 2010–11

Country
Australia
 AFF Women's Championship: 2008

External links
 

1989 births
Living people
Australian women's soccer players
Central Coast Mariners FC (A-League Women) players
Sydney FC (A-League Women) players
A-League Women players
Women's association football midfielders
People from the South Coast (New South Wales)
Sportswomen from New South Wales
Soccer players from New South Wales